I Love You Drops is a studio album by American country singer-songwriter Bill Anderson. It was released in August 1966 on Decca Records and was produced by Owen Bradley. It was Anderson's fifth studio release and included three singles that became major hits on the Billboard country chart. The album would also become a success on the Billboard country albums list upon its release, becoming one of his most successful charting albums.

Background and content
I Love You Drops was recorded in May 1966 at Bradley's Barn, a studio located in Mount Juliet, Tennessee. The studio was owned by the record's producer, Owen Bradley. Anderson had recorded all of his albums up to this point with Bradley. The album consisted of 12 tracks altogether. Among the album's tracks were cover versions of songs originally recorded by other artists in country music. The third track, "Talkin' to the Wall", was originally released as a single by Warner Mack. The second track on side two, "In the Summertime", was written and recorded by Roger Miller. The fourth track on side two was a cover of Hank Williams's "I'm So Lonesome I Could Cry". Seven of the songs were composed by Anderson. Among these songs was the record's title track and the track "Think I'll Go Somewhere and Cry Myself to Sleep".

Release and reception
I Love You Drops was released in August 1966 on Decca Records. It was his fifth studio album release since joining Decca's roster in 1958. The album was released as a vinyl record, with six songs on side one and side two.  I Love You Drops peaked at number one on the Billboard Top Country Albums chart on October 15, 1966. It became Anderson's highest-charting album and his only one to reach the top position on Billboard. Three singles released between 1965 and 1966 were included on the album. The song, "Certain", appeared on side two of the record and was issued as a single in February 1965. The song reached number 12 on the Billboard Hot Country Singles chart in May 1965. The title track was released in December 1965 as a single to radio. The song became a top ten hit, reaching number four on the Billboard country singles chart in May 1966. In August 1966, the track "I Get the Fever" was issued as the third and final single. The single became a number one hit on the country singles chart by November 1966, Anderson's third number one hit single as a recording artist. The album received two out of five stars from Allmusic in years following its initial release.

Track listing

Personnel
All credits are adapted from the liner notes of I Love You Drops.

Musical personnel
 Bill Anderson – lead vocals
 Harold Bradley – guitar
 Floyd Cramer – piano
 Ray Edenton – guitar
 Roy Huskey – bass
 The Jordanaires – background vocals
 The Anita Kerr Singers – background vocals
 Grady Martin – guitar
 Len Miller – drums
 Weldon Myrick – steel guitar
 Hargus "Pig" Robbins – piano
 Jerry Shook – guitar
 Joe Zinkan – bass

Technical personnel
 Owen Bradley – record producer
 Hal Buksbaum – photography

Chart performance

Release history

References

1966 albums
Albums produced by Owen Bradley
Bill Anderson (singer) albums
Decca Records albums